John H. Hamilton  (28 February 1879 – 17 April 1925) was a Scottish professional footballer who made over 100 appearances in the Southern League for Brentford as a centre half. He also played in the Scottish League and Football League for Leith Athletic and Leeds City respectively.

Personal life 
While a player with Swansea Town, Hamilton worked on the Swansea docks. Hamilton served in the Argyll and Sutherland Highlanders and the Machine Gun Corps during the First World War and saw action in Mesopotamia. He won the Military Medal during the course of his service.

Career statistics

Honours 
Swansea Town

 Welsh Cup: 1912–13

References

1879 births
1925 deaths
Scottish footballers
Brentford F.C. players
English Football League players
Association football midfielders
Leith Athletic F.C. players
Leeds City F.C. players
Southern Football League players
Footballers from Fife
Swansea City A.F.C. players
Barry Town United F.C. players
Scottish Football League players
Lochgelly United F.C. players
Dunfermline Athletic F.C. players
Cowdenbeath F.C. players
Military personnel from Angus, Scotland
British Army personnel of World War I
Argyll and Sutherland Highlanders soldiers
Machine Gun Corps soldiers
Recipients of the Military Medal